In 2018 "Contender Series Brasil" debuted as a spin off Dana White's Contender Series. Unlike the U.S. version this was not shown live and instead was recorded over two days, August 10 and 11, 2018. The fifteen fights are then broadcast over three episodes on Combate, Globo and SporTV from August 24.

Week 1 - August 24

Contract awards 
The following fighters were awarded contracts with the UFC:
Rogério Bontorin, Mayra Bueno Silva, Sarah Frota, and Augusto Sakai

Week 2 - August 31

Contract awards 
The following fighters were awarded contracts with the UFC:
Taila Santos, Johnny Walker, and Marina Rodriguez

Week 3 - September 7

Contract awards 
The following fighters were awarded contracts with the UFC:
Raulian Paiva, Vinicius Moreira, Luana Carolina, and Thiago Moisés

References

Ultimate Fighting Championship television series